John Aked Taylor, Baron Ingrow  (15 August 1917 – 7 February 2002) was a British soldier, brewer and Conservative politician.

Born to Percy and Gladys Taylor, he was educated at Shrewsbury School. During World War II Taylor served in the Duke of Wellington's Regiment and subsequently with the Royal Signals with whom he carried out decoding work in Norway, the Middle East, north Africa, Italy, north-west Europe, and Burma and was decorated with the Territorial Decoration (TD) in 1951.

Taylor was for 40 years chairman and managing director of Timothy Taylor & Co, the family brewery in Keighley, West Yorkshire founded by his grandfather Timothy Taylor in 1858.

Taylor was a member of Keighley Town Council for 21 years from 1946, serving as mayor in 1956. For nearly 20 years (1964–83) Taylor was a member of the Executive Committee of the National Union of Conservative and Unionist Associations; for five years (1971–76) he served as its chairman.

In 1960, Taylor was made an Officer of the Order of the British Empire (OBE). He was knighted in 1972 and created a life peer as Baron Ingrow, of Keighley in the County of West Yorkshire on 31 January 1983. From 1985 to 1992 he was Lord Lieutenant of West Yorkshire, having been a Deputy Lieutenant before.

Lord Ingrow was married to Barbara Stirk from 1949 until her death in 1997.  They had two daughters.

References 

1917 births
2002 deaths
People educated at Shrewsbury School
Knights Bachelor
Conservative Party (UK) life peers
Mayors of Keighley
Officers of the Order of the British Empire
English brewers
Lord-Lieutenants of West Yorkshire
Royal Corps of Signals soldiers
People from Keighley
British Army personnel of World War II
Duke of Wellington's Regiment soldiers
20th-century English businesspeople
Life peers created by Elizabeth II